Catagonium emarginatum is a species of moss from the genus Catagonium. It was discovered by Shan Hsiung Lin in Bolivia.

References

Hypnales